Richard Thomas Marotta (born January 7, 1948) is an American drummer and percussionist.  He has appeared on recordings by leading artists such as Aretha Franklin, Carly Simon, Steely Dan, James Taylor, Paul Simon, John Lennon, Hall & Oates, Stevie Nicks, Wynonna, Roy Orbison, Todd Rundgren, Roberta Flack, Peter Frampton, Quincy Jones, Jackson Browne, Al Kooper, Waylon Jennings, Randy Newman, Kenny G, The Jacksons, Crosby, Stills & Nash, Warren Zevon, and Linda Ronstadt. He is also a composer who created music for the popular television shows Everybody Loves Raymond and Yes, Dear.

Biography
Marotta was born in New York City and taught himself to play drums at the age of nineteen.  He was in a band called The Riverboat Soul Band, which released an album called Mess-up in 1968.

Marotta spent several years in the early 1970s as the drummer for his own group, the short-lived Brethren.  Tom Cosgrove sang and played lead, Stu Woods played bass, and Mike Garson played keyboards. They released two albums; the first was the eponymous Brethren, which was mildly successful. The second, released as the band was crumbling, is almost impossible to find. The band had a unique sound, a mixture of rock and country, with traces of jazz and influences from Dr. John, who wrote the album notes and the song "Loop Garoo" for them.

Marotta has composed music for the television sitcoms Everybody Loves Raymond and Yes, Dear. He made a guest appearance in the episode "Johnny and the Pace Makers" of the situation comedy Double Rush in 1995.

Marotta's brother, Jerry, is also a noted drummer and percussionist who has recorded and toured with Peter Gabriel.

Selected discography

With Peter Allen
 I Could Have Been a Sailor (A&M, 1979)
With Marty Balin
 Lucky (EMI, 1983)
With Karla Bonoff
 Restless Nights (Columbia, 1979)
With Jackson Browne 
 Hold Out (Asylum, 1980)
With Felix Cavaliere
 Destiny (Bearsville, 1975)
With Toni Childs
 Union (A&M, 1988)
 House of Hope (A&M, 1991)
With Linda Clifford
 I'll Keep on Loving You (Capitol, 1982)
With Shawn Colvin
 Steady On (Columbia Records, 1989)
With Randy Crawford
 Everything Must Change (Warner Bros., 1976)
 Raw Silk (Warner Bros., 1979)
With Jim Croce
 I Got a Name (ABC Records, 1973)
With Crosby, Stills & Nash
 After the Storm (Columbia, 1994)
With Yvonne Elliman
 Yvonne Elliman (Decca, 1972)
With Bryan Ferry
 The Bride Stripped Bare (EG Records, 1978)
With Dan Fogelberg
 Exiles (Epic, 1987)
With Aretha Franklin
 Let Me in Your Life (Atlantic, 1974)
With Michael Franks
 Tiger in the Rain (Warner Bros., 1979)
 One Bad Habit (Warner Bros., 1980)
With Art Garfunkel 
 Scissors Cut (Columbia, 1981)
With Ellie Greenwich
 Let It Be Written, Let it Be Sung (Verve, 1973)
With Nanci Griffith
 Little Love Affairs (MCA, 1988)
With Andrew Gold
 All This and Heaven Too (Asylum Records, 1977)
 Whirlwind (Asylum Records, 1980)
With Hall & Oates
 Abandoned Luncheonette (Atlantic, 1973)
With Beth Hart
 Fire on the Floor (Provogue, 2016)
With Donny Hathaway
 Extension of a Man (Atco, 1973)
With Cissy Houston
 Cissy Houston (Private Stock, 1977)
With The Jacksons
 Destiny (Epic, 1978)
With Garland Jeffreys
 Ghost Writer (A&M, 1977)
With Rickie Lee Jones
 It's Like This (Artemis, 2000)
With Wynonna Judd
 Wynonna (Curb, 1992)
With Robin Kenyatta
 Gypsy Man (Atlantic, 1973)
With Chaka Khan
 Chaka (Warner Bros, 1978)
With Al Kooper
 Easy Does It (Columbia, 1970)
With Labelle
 Moon Shadow (Warner Bros., 1972)
With John Lennon 
 Mind Games (Apple, 1973)
With Ralph MacDonald
 Sound of a Drum (Marlin Records, 1976)
With Herbie Mann
 Surprises (Atlantic, 1976)
 Brazil: Once Again (Atlantic, 1977)
With Eric Martin
 Eric Martin (Capitol, 1985)
With Don McLean
 Playin' Favorites (United Artists, 1973)
With Melanie
 Madrugada (Neighborhood, 1974)
With Bette Midler 
 Bette Midler (Atlantic, 1973)
 Bathhouse Betty (Warner Bros, 1998)
With Roxy Music
 Avalon (EG Records, 1982)
With Randy Newman
 Little Criminals (Warner Bros., 1977)
With Juice Newton
 Dirty Looks (Capitol, 1983)
With Laura Nyro
 Smile (Columbia, 1976)
With The Oak Ridge Boys
 Monongahela (MCA, 1988)
With Yoko Ono
 A Story (Rykkodisc, 1997)
With Dolly Parton
 Burlap & Satin (RCA, 1983)
With Annette Peacock
 I'm the One (RCA Victor, 1972)
 X-Dreams (Aura, 1978)
With Bonnie Raitt 
 The Glow (Warner Bros., 1979)
With Linda Ronstadt
 Simple Dreams (Asylum, 1977)
 Get Closer (Asylum, 1982)
With Diana Ross
 Silk Electric (RCA, 1982)
With Boz Scaggs
 Middle Man (Columbia, 1980)
With Janis Siegel
 At Home (Atlantic, 1987)
With Carly Simon
 Hotcakes (Elektra, 1974)
 Spy (Elektra, 1979)
 Come Upstairs (Elektra, 1980)
 Torch (Warner Bros., 1981)
 Hello Big Man (Warner Bros., 1983)
 Letters Never Sent (Arista, 1994)
 This Kind of Love (Hear Music, 2008)
With Paul Simon
 There Goes Rhymin' Simon (Columbia, 1973)
With Phoebe Snow
 Against the Grain (Columbia Records, 1978)
With J. D. Souther 
 You're Only Lonely (Columbia Records, 1979)
With Steely Dan
 The Royal Scam (ABC, 1976)
 Aja (ABC, 1977)
 Gaucho (MCA, 1980)
With James Taylor
 Walking Man (Warner Bros., 1974)
 Dad Loves His Work (Columbia, 1981)
With Livingston Taylor
 Over the Rainbow (Capricorn, 1973)
With John Tropea
 Tropea (Video Arts, 1975)
 Short Trip to Space (Video Arts, 1977)
 Touch You Again (Video Arts, 1979)
With Frankie Valli 
 Closeup (Private Stock, 1975)
With Joe Walsh
 The Confessor (Warner Bros., 1985)
With Edgar Winter
 Jasmine Nightdreams (Blue Sky, 1975)
With Warren Zevon
 Excitable Boy (Asylum, 1978)
 Bad Luck Streak in Dancing School (Elektra, 1980)
 The Envoy'' (Asylum, 1982)

References

External links
 
 
 
 Rick Marotta Interview NAMM Oral History Library (2008)

1948 births
Living people
American session musicians
American people of Italian descent
American rock drummers
American jazz drummers
20th-century American drummers
American male drummers
American male jazz musicians
20th-century American male musicians